Potlicker Flats is a census-designated place located in Armagh Township, Mifflin County in the state of Pennsylvania, United States.  The community is located along US 322 in northern Mifflin County, north of the community of Milroy.  As of the 2010 census the population was 172 residents.

Demographics

References

Census-designated places in Mifflin County, Pennsylvania
Census-designated places in Pennsylvania